Rialto Records may refer to:

 Rialto Records (1920s), the parent company of Apollo Records (1921)
 Rialto Records, a UK label; see, for example Archive Series